Arthur Võõbus ( – 25 September 1988) was an Estonian theologian, orientalist, and church historian.

Biography 
Arthur Võõbus was born in Matjama village, Tartu County, Livonia, Russian Empire as the son of a teacher. In 1928, he completed his schooling at the Hugo Treffner Gymnasium in Tartu, then in 1932 his studies at the Theological Faculty of the University of Tartu. That same year he was ordained a priest. From 1933 to 1940 he was a pastor in the Estonian Evangelical Lutheran Church in Tartu. Arthur Võõbus graduated as master of theology in 1934 with a thesis on "The true Christian, true Christian life and the true Christian church by Soren Kirkegaard". In parallel, Arthur Võõbus worked in libraries and manuscript collections in Rome, Paris, London, Berlin and Leipzig on theological texts in Syriac. His language skills were acquired at the university under Uku Masing.

In 1936 he married Ilse Luksep, a daughter of a wealthy merchant family, which, along with his job in a large parish, provided the material basis for his research. Towards the end of the 1930s Võõbus worked on the publication of Syriac texts. In 1940 he fled the Soviet occupation of Estonia to Germany. His dissident attitude led to observation by the Gestapo. After the occupation of Estonia by German troops Võõbus returned to Estonia. His doctoral thesis in 1943 at the University of Tartu was concerned with monasticism in Syria, Mesopotamia and Persia before the 10th Century.

In 1944 Võõbus and his family fled a second time before the Soviet reoccupation of Estonia. From 1944 to 1948 he worked as a pastor in refugee camps, 1946–1948 he was professor of church history at the Baltic University at Pinneberg, near Hamburg. When this university was closed, he worked in London at the British Museum, from then until 1977 as professor of the New Testament and the ancient church history at the Lutheran School of Theology at Chicago (LSTC). Arthur Võõbus was a member of several scientific academies, including the Royal Academy of Science, Letters and Fine Arts of Belgium. Võõbus died on 25 September 1988 in Oak, Park, Illinois, United States

Until 2016, the Institute of Syrian Manuscript Studies, Chicago maintained the Professor Arthur Võõbus Collection of Syrian Manuscripts.

In 2016, due to financial constraints, the Institute of Syrian Manuscript Studies entered into an agreement with the Hill Museum & Manuscript Library (HMML) and the entire collection is transferred and stored in HMML's microfilm vault. HMML undertakes responsibility for the continued digitization of the films and the hosting of the images. 

His works were studied by the philologist and historian Marju Lepajõe, amongst other scholars.

Works
Communism's Challenge to Christianity (1950)
Early Versions of the New Testament. Manuscript Studies: Oriental Texts and Facsimile Plates of Syriac, Armenian, Georgian, Coptic, Ethiopic and Arabic Manuscripts (Stockholm: 1954) 
The Communist Menace, the Present Chaos and Our Christian Responsibility (New York: 1957)
History of asceticism in the Syrian Orient (Louvain: 1958) 
The Department of Theology at the University of Tartu: Its Life and Work, Martyrdom and Annihilation (Stockholm: 1963)
Discoveries of Great Import on the Commentary on Luke by Cyril of Alexandria: The Emergence of New Manuscript Sources for the Syriac Version (1973)
Important New Manuscript Sources for the Islamic Law in Syriac: Contributions to the History of Jurisprudence in the Syrian Orient. (1975)
The Martyrs of Estonia: The Suffering, Ordeal and Annihilation of the Churches under the Russian Occupation (Stockholm: ETSE, 1984)
Studies in the History of the Estonian People, Volume 11

Festschrift
 Robert H. Fischer (ed.), A Tribute to Arthur Vööbus: Studies in Early Christian Literature and Its Environment, Primarily in the Syrian East, Chicago: Lutheran School of Theology at Chicago, 1977.

References

External links
Photo of the young pastor Arthur Võõbus
Arthur Võõbus at his desk in later life
Works by Arthur Võõbus at the Internet Archive

1909 births
1988 deaths
People from Peipsiääre Parish
People from the Governorate of Livonia
Estonian Lutheran clergy
Estonian scholars
University of Tartu alumni
Hugo Treffner Gymnasium alumni
Estonian emigrants to the United States
Estonian World War II refugees